Alain Boire (born June 23, 1971) is a Quebec politician.

Born in Montreal, Quebec, Boire was a Bloc Québécois member of the House of Commons of Canada. He represented the district of Beauharnois—Salaberry from 2004 to 2006. He was the Bloc critic of Youth. He is a former businessman, electrician and technician. He lost his nomination for the 2006 election.

External links
 
 How'd They Vote?: Alain Boire's voting history and quotes

1971 births
Bloc Québécois MPs
Businesspeople from Montreal
French Quebecers
Living people
Members of the House of Commons of Canada from Quebec
Politicians from Montreal
21st-century Canadian politicians